Bender: Gold of the Empire, also known as Ostap Bender Trilogy is a 2021 Russian action adventure comedy film directed by Igor Zaytsev, a sequel to the film Bender: The Beginning from the production company Sreda. It was theatrically released in Russia on 15 July 2021.

Plot 
Ibrahim Bender and his student Ostap suddenly lose a precious treasure and it falls into the hands of Nestor Makhno, who is sure that there are other relics in the vicinity. As a result, reds, whites, bandits and partisans start hunting for gold.

Cast 
 Sergey Bezrukov as Ibrahim Suleiman Berta-Maria Bender-Bey
 Aram Vardevanyan as Osip "Osya" Zadunaisky (Ostap Bender-Zadunaisky)
 Nikita Kologrivyy as Mishka Yaponchik
 Yuliya Makarova as Sofi Sokolovich
 Vera Brezhneva as Robber
 Yuri Kolokolnikov as Grigory Kotovsky
 Pavel Derevyanko as Nestor Makhno
 Aleksandr Tsekalo as Mark Sokolovich
 Yuliya Rutberg as Madame Sokolovich
 Olga Sutulova as Maria Zadunaiskaya, Osip Zadunaisky's mother 
 Artyom Tkachenko as Staff captain Mishin-Ametistov

Production 
The film is slated to be merged with the prequel, Bender: The Beginning, and the sequel, Bender: The Final Hustle, to be released as a TV series.

See also
 Bender: The Beginning – Part 1 (2021 film)
 Bender: The Final Hustle – Part 3 (2021 film)

References

External links 
 

2021 films
2020s Russian-language films
2021 action adventure films
2021 action comedy films
2020s adventure comedy films
Russian action adventure films
Russian action comedy films
Russian adventure comedy films
Films about the Russian Empire
Films based on television series